Mikhail Mikhailovich Somov (in Moscow – 30 December 1973, in Leningrad) was a Soviet oceanologist, polar explorer, Doctor of Geographical Sciences (1954).

Somov graduated from the Moscow Hydrometeorological Institute in 1937. In 1939, he was appointed senior researcher at the Arctic and Antarctic Research Institute. In 1950–1951, Mikhail Somov headed a drift-ice station North Pole-2. In 1955–1957, he became the commander of the first Soviet Antarctic Expedition. Mikhail Somov was also the first Soviet delegate to the Scientific Committee on Antarctic Research.

The Somov Sea north of Victoria Land and a glacier in Queen Maud Land (both East Antarctica) bear Mikhail Somov's name, as well as a scientific icebreaker. A minor planet 3334 Somov discovered by Czech astronomer Antonín Mrkos in 1981 is named after him. Somov was awarded the title Hero of the Soviet Union in 1952.

Awards 
 Hero of the Soviet Union (1952)
 Three Orders of Lenin
 Vega medal (from the Swedish Society for Anthropology and Geography) (1959)
 Patron's Medal (from the Royal Geographical Society) (1961)

References

External links 
 Михаил Михайлович Сомов (1908 - 1973)  (in Russian)

Explorers of Antarctica
Heroes of the Soviet Union
Soviet polar explorers
1973 deaths
1908 births
Recipients of the Order of Lenin
Scientists from Moscow